Western Distributor may refer to:

Western Distributor (Sydney), an elevated freeway in Sydney, Australia
West Gate Tunnel, a proposed toll road and tunnel in Melbourne, Australia initially named Western Distributor

See also
Distributor (disambiguation)
Eastern Distributor (Sydney)